William Craig Smith (December 9, 1918 – August 22, 1986) was an American art director. He was nominated for an Academy Award in the category Best Art Direction for the film Victor/Victoria.

Selected filmography
 Victor/Victoria (1982)

References

External links
 

1918 births
1986 deaths
American art directors
Artists from Philadelphia